France's national rugby union team is the nation's representative side. The team has played Test match rugby since 1906, when they played New Zealand national rugby union team in Paris. The record for most Test match appearances, or caps, is held by Fabien Pelous with 118. Serge Blanco played for France between 1980 and 1991, and has scored 38 Test tries for France – more than any other player. The record for most Test points is held by Frédéric Michalak, who has scored 422 points for France in his 74 Test matches to date.

Caps
The following is a list of the ten French team players with the highest number of Test appearances. Updated 5 February 2023.

Career tries
The following is a list of the ten French team players with the most Test tries. Updated 18 March 2023.

Career points

Updated 5 February 2023.

Points in a match

Last updated: Italy vs France, 5 February 2023. Statistics include officially capped matches only.

Tries in a match

Last updated: Italy vs France, 5 February 2023. Statistics include officially capped matches only.

Matches as captain

Last updated Italy vs France, 5 February 2023. Statistics include officially capped matches only.

Youngest players

Last updated: Italy vs France, 5 February 2023. Statistics include officially capped matches only.

Oldest players

Last updated: Italy vs France, 5 February 2023. Statistics include officially capped matches only.

References

Records
Rugby union records and statistics